Henry Stanley Shank (February 18, 1892 – March 19, 1962) was an American football Halfback who played one season for the Decatur Staleys of the American Professional Football Association. He played college football at the University of Maryland.

External links
Henry Shank Bio (Staley Museum)

References

1892 births
1962 deaths
American football halfbacks
Maryland Terrapins football players
Decatur Staleys players
Players of American football from Chicago